ISO 3166-2:TV is the entry for Tuvalu in ISO 3166-2, part of the ISO 3166 standard published by the International Organization for Standardization (ISO), which defines codes for the names of the principal subdivisions (e.g., provinces or states) of all countries coded in ISO 3166-1.

Currently for Tuvalu, ISO 3166-2 codes are defined for 1 town council and 7 island councils. Niulakita, which now has its own island council, is not listed as it is administered as part of Niutao.

Each code consists of two parts, separated by a hyphen. The second part is three letters.

Current codes
Subdivision names are listed as in the ISO 3166-2 standard published by the ISO 3166 Maintenance Agency (ISO 3166/MA).

Click on the button in the header to sort each column.

Changes
The following changes to the entry have been announced in newsletters by the ISO 3166/MA since the first publication of ISO 3166-2 in 1998:

See also
 Subdivisions of Tuvalu

References

External links
 ISO Online Browsing Platform: TV
 Island Councils of Tuvalu, Statoids.com

2:TV
Tuvalu-related lists